Romilly is a surname, and may refer to:

Edward Romilly (1804–1870), an English amateur cricketer who played first-class cricket from 1825 to 1831, and a Member of Parliament from 1832 to 1835
Esmond Romilly (1918–1941), British socialist and anti-fascist, married to one of the Mitford sisters
Frederick Romilly (1810–1887), a British Whig politician who sat in the House of Commons from 1850 to 1852 and a cricketer who played for Marylebone Cricket Club (MCC)
Giles Romilly (1916–1967), British journalist, Nazi POW, Esmond's brother
Hugh Hastings Romilly (1856–1892), a British explorer in the Pacific, son of Frederick Romilly
Jean Romilly (1714–1796), Genevan watchmaker, journalist and encyclopédiste
Jean-Edme Romilly (1739 or 40–1779), Genevan  theologian and encyclopédiste, son of Jean Romilly
Jacqueline de Romilly (born 1913), French philologist
John Romilly, 1st Baron Romilly (1802–1874), English judge
Joseph Romilly (1791–1864), English academic administrator
Samuel Romilly (1757–1818), English legal reformer, MP for Westminster